Sceloporus dugesii, also known commonly as Dugès' spiny lizard and la lagartija espinosa de Dugès del este in Mexican Spanish, is a species of lizard in the family Phrynosomatidae. The species is endemic to Mexico.

Etymology
The specific name, dugesii, is in honor of French-born Mexican naturalist Alfredo Dugès, who is considered to be the "father" of Mexican herpetology.

Geographic range
S. dugesii is found in western Mexico, in the Mexican States of Colima, Guanajuato, Jalisco, Michoacán, and Nayarit.

Habitat
The preferred natural habitat of S. dugesii is rocky areas in forest and shrubland.

Behavior
S. dugesii is terrestrial and saxicolous (rock-dwelling).

Reproduction
S. dugesii is ovoviviparous.

References

Further reading
Arenas-Monroy, José Carlos (2013). "Geographic Distribution: Sceloporus dugesii (Dugès' Spiny Lizard)". Herpetological Review 44 (3): 475.
Bocourt MF (1874). "Note sur quelques espèces nouvelles d'Iguaniens du genre Sceloporus". Annales des sciences naturelles, Zoologie et paléontologie, Cinquième série 17 (10): 1–2. (Sceloporus dugesii, new species, p. 2). (in French).
Boulenger GA (1885). Catalogue of the Lizards in the British Museum (Natural History). Second Edition. Volume II. ... Iguanidæ .... London: Trustees of the British Museum (Natural History). (Taylor and Francis, printers). xiii + 497 pp. + Plates I–XXIV. (Sceloporus dugesii, pp. 224–225).
Smith HM, Taylor EH (1950). "An Annotated Checklist and Key to the Reptiles of Mexico Exclusive of the Snakes". Bulletin of the United States National Museum (199): 1–253. (Sceloporus dugesii, p. 127).

Sceloporus
Endemic reptiles of Mexico
Reptiles described in 1874
Taxa named by Marie Firmin Bocourt